Derek Redvers Hilton (3 February 1927 – 11 July 2005) was an English musician and composer who worked for most of his professional career as musical director at Granada Television. He is mostly remembered for his television themes and is credited as writing a total of 241. He also composed under the pseudonym John Snow.

Childhood 
Derek Hilton was born on 3 February 1927 at a modest terraced house in York Street, Whitefield, near Bury, Lancashire. The son of Alfred Redvers Hilton, a keen amateur operatic singer, and Emily, a Shropshire girl in service as a maid, Derek began piano lessons at six-years old. Showbusiness had fired his imagination after visiting the music hall at Bury Hippodrome, where he recalled the spotlights transforming the dingy hall into a pink and magical palace.  'When I was nine or ten I used to make stages and put tiny musicians on them,' he said.  'I always wanted to play music.’

Experience 

By fourteen years of age Derek was leading his band 'The Rhythmic Blue Notes' on the accordion, as well as becoming a founder member of Besses o' th' Barn Brass Band on the trombone. Conscripted at 18, he joined the King's Own Yorkshire Light Infantry and persuaded his officers at Berwick-on-Tweed that he was more useful playing the piano in the Mess than out on the parade ground.   Next came postings to Italy, Austria, Germany and France with "Stars in Battledress" alongside Harry Secombe, Peter Sellers and Spike Milligan. Working with stars including Gracie Fields, Kay Kendall and Richard Tauber as pianist and arranger gave him invaluable experience in jotting down parts at high speed for each night's performance.

In Germany Derek met his first wife Mary Witsenburg, a Dutch girl stranded in Hamburg throughout the war and they married in London in 1949. There followed a busy time touring as pianist with orchestras and leaders such as Johnny Dankworth and Sonny Rose, eventually spending three happy years working in dance bands in Jersey. After settling back in Manchester in 1953, he taught at the Regional Schools of Music led by Johnny Roadhouse at Decibel Studios, Oxford Road.

Big Break 

Hilton's big break came when his trio provided the music at the Press Reception for the newly launched Granada TV in 1956.  A few weeks later, Derek was called in to play 'Mountain Greenery' on 'Spot the Tune' leading to a permanent spot. Soon Derek's professionalism led to his regularly playing at two shows a day, five days a week: ‘Sharp at Four’ and ‘People and Places’ at 6 pm.  The Derek Hilton Trio, originally with Derek at the piano, Bob Duffy on bass and Bob Turner at the drums were a staple of Granada’s ‘People and Places’, exchanging sardonic repartee with presenter Billy Grundy.  The line-up changed over time to Amos Smith on drums and finally to Dave Lynane on bass and Dave Hassall as drummer.  From 1963 – 1964 The Derek Hilton Trio were also resident musicians at Manchester nightclub Mr Smiths. By 1963 Derek had composed, arranged or played more than 500 TV themes. As musical director at Granada TV Derek is credited with writing the highest number of television themes in the United Kingdom – a total of 241.

Granada Television credits 

 A Kind of Loving
 All Our Yesterdays   
 Big Breadwinner Hog
 The Caesars
 Laurence Olivier Presents: Cat on a Hot Tin Roof, The Glass Menagerie
 Comedians
 Country Matters
 The Corridor People
 Cribb  
 Criss-Cross Quiz
 The Cuckoo Waltz
 D H Lawrence
 The Division
 The Dustbin Men
 The Entertainers
 Fallen Hero
 The Flower of Gloster
 The Glamour Girls
 For King and Country
 Ghost of Motley Hall
 Granada Close Down Music
 Haunted
 Hickory House
 Inheritance
 ITV Playhouse (12 episodes 1967–1969)
 Judge Dee
 Last of the Baskets
 Leave it to Charlie
 Lift Off
 The Lovers
 Lost Empires 
 Man in Room 17
 Maths is Fun
 Murder
 Nearest and Dearest (TV theme and film)
 The Odd Man/It's Dark Outside/Mr Rose (Mr Rose theme composed under pseudonym John Snow)
 Once Upon A Time
 Paris 1900
 Shabby Tiger
 Shades of Darkness
 The Sinners
 Spindoe
 This Year Next Year
 Yanks Go Home

Notable performance credits 

 Spot That Tune (209 shows)
 People and Places (Derek Hilton Trio daily spot 1958 -1963)
 World in Action Theme jam 
 Coronation Street – piano accompanist to Rita Fairclough (Barbara Knox)
 The Wheeltappers and Shunters Social Club

Stage credits

 Feed
 Clogs

Awards

 Country Matters 1973 Ivor Novello Award, Outstanding Contribution to British Popular Music.

Nominations

 Lost Empires [1987] Best Original Television Music.
 Lost Empires [1987] Ivor Novello nomination for Best Theme

Miscellaneous Work 

In 1969 he created the theme to radio's long-standing 'Waggoner's Walk, heard daily on Radio 2.  Other credits are incidental music for Sherlock Holmes, Inspector Morse, and Brideshead Revisited. To the general viewer Derek was perhaps best known for re-recording and re-arranging the Coronation Street theme in 1972 and accompanying Rita Fairclough (Barbara Knox) at the piano when she sang on the show.  He was also a regular at the keyboard at The Wheeltapper's and Shunter's Social Club where he was the MD overseeing 'the turns.'  A passionate Bury FC fan, in 1972 Derek wrote Bury's anthem Aye, aye, Up the Shakers sung by The Bury Tones which was for many years a rousing anthem for Shakers fans.

De Wolfe Music contains several of Derek's' library tracks which are available currently.

Personal life 

After thirty-two years with Granada, Hilton retired, though continuing to write music, for the stage play Feed and as Musical Director on P & O and Cunard cruise ships.  He was married twice, the second time to Valerie George, whom he later divorced. Hilton died on 11 July 2005 and leaves three daughters from his first marriage, Marijke Snell, Lorraine Howell, a designer and Martine Bailey, a writer.

References

External links 
 Derek Hilton at De Wolfe Website
 Derek Hilton (under the pseudonym John Snow) at De Wolfe Website
 
 Derek Hilton and John Snow at the MCPS-PRS Website

1927 births
2005 deaths
People from Whitefield, Greater Manchester
20th-century British musicians
20th-century British Army personnel
King's Own Yorkshire Light Infantry soldiers